TER Occitanie or liO Train is the regional rail network serving the region of Occitanie, southern France. It is operated by the French national railway company SNCF. It was formed in 2017 from the previous TER networks TER Languedoc-Roussillon and TER Midi-Pyrénées, after the respective regions were merged.

Network

The rail and bus network as of May 2022:

Rail

Bus

 8: Rodez – Laissac – Sévérac-le-Château – Millau
 13: Longages-Noé – Saint-Sulpice-sur-Lèze
 14: Montréjeau-Gourdan-Polignan – Luchon

See also

Réseau Ferré de France
List of SNCF stations in Occitanie

References

External links
 Official Site (SNCF)

 
TER